Constantine Lyngdoh was an Indian politician of the Hill State People's Democratic Party from Meghalaya. He was elected in Meghalaya Legislative Assembly election in 1993 from Nongpoh constituency as candidate of Hill State People's Democratic Party where he defeated Chief Minister of Meghalaya D. D. Lapang.

References 

1956 births
2019 deaths
Hill State People's Democratic Party politicians
Meghalaya MLAs 1993–1998
People from Ri-Bhoi district